The Taunton Daily Gazette (and Taunton Sunday Gazette) is a daily newspaper founded in 1848.  Based in Taunton, Massachusetts, its coverage area also includes Berkley, Rehoboth, Dighton, Lakeville, Norton, and Raynham.

On December 1, 2006, Journal Register Company announced it would sell the Gazette, along with the Fall River Herald News, to GateHouse Media. Since early 2007, the Gazette has been published as part of GateHouse Media New England.

See also 
Bristol County, Massachusetts
Greater Taunton Area
Taunton Call
 List of newspapers in Massachusetts

References

External links
Taunton Daily Gazette online edition

Newspapers published in Massachusetts
Publications established in 1848
Taunton, Massachusetts
Gannett publications